The African and Eastern Trade Corporation was incorporated in Liverpool in 1919 and had establishments in several African Colonies.

It served in the Congo side by side with the British Consulate as a semi-official representative for British trading interests in that Colony. Both Huileries du Congo Belge (HCB) and the African and Eastern Trade Corporation employed a number of English-speaking employees of both European and African origin. In 1929 the corporation merged with the Royal Niger Company (both owned by Lever Brothers) forming a new trading enterprise, the United Africa Company Limited (UAC).

The African and Eastern Trading Corporation was also a large share owner in the Ashanti goldfield in the Gold Coast, as well it had a shipping line. By 1930 the merged United Africa Company was having financial difficulty and had suffered large losses, mainly because of the African and Eastern Trade Corporation component being unable to bear its half-share of the UAC losses. By this time the parent company Lever Brothers had amalgamated with the Margarine Union to form the company known as Unilever. Unilever came to the rescue with millions of pounds, in return for which Unilever took over the conglomerate of companies.

See also

 List of trading companies

External links
 

Trading companies of the United Kingdom
British companies established in 1919
British companies disestablished in 1930
Trading companies established in the 20th century
Trading companies disestablished in the 20th century